Gopalan may refer to:

A. K. Gopalan (1904–1977), Indian Communist leader
K. P. Gopalan (1908–1977), Indian Communist leader
K. P. R. Gopalan (died 1997), Indian Communist leader
M. J. Gopalan (1909–2003), Indian cricket and hockey player
M. J. Gopalan Trophy, a cricket tournament between Ceylon and Madras
Prahladan Gopalan, Indian politician
Prema Gopalan, Indian social activist
P.V. Gopalan (1911-1998), Indian freedom fighter and civil servant
Shyamala Gopalan (1938–2009), Indian-American cancer researcher and civil rights activist
Susheela Gopalan (1929–2001), MP and Indian Communist leader
Crazy Gopalan, a Malayalam film (2008)
Gopalan, central character of the film Crazy Gopalan
7754 Gopalan, an asteroid
Gopulu (1924–2015), Tamil illustrator, real name S. Gopalan